Ödemiş is a village in the Ilgaz District of Çankırı Province in Turkey. Its population is 49 (2021).

Notable people
 Ekin-Su Cülcüloğlu, winner of the 8th season of Love Island

References

Villages in Ilgaz District